Soglio is a comune (municipality) in the Province of Asti in the Italian region Piedmont, located about  east of Turin and about  northwest of Asti.

Soglio borders the following municipalities: Camerano Casasco, Cortanze, Cortazzone, Montechiaro d'Asti, Piea, and Viale.

Demographic evolution

References

Cities and towns in Piedmont